The 2000–01 Divizia D was the 59th season of the Liga IV, the fourth tier of the Romanian football league system. The champions of each county association play against one from a neighboring county in a play-off match played on a neutral venue. The winners of the play-off matches promoted to Divizia C.

Promotion play-off 

The matches was scheduled to be played on 20 June 2001.

|colspan=3 style="background-color:#97DEFF;"|20 June 2001

|}

County leagues

Cluj County

Galați County

Harghita County

Mureș County

Neamț County

Vâlcea County

See also 
 2000–01 Divizia A
 2000–01 Divizia B

References

External links
 FRF

Liga IV seasons
4
Romania